Thestor claassensi, the Claassen's skolly, is a butterfly of the family Lycaenidae. It is found in South Africa, where it is only known from the West Cape on coastal rocky outcrops in fynbos near Stilnaai between Knysna and Cape Town.

The wingspan is 27–36 mm for males and 29–39 mm for females. Adults are on wing from November to early December. There is one generation per year.

References

Thestor
Butterflies described in 2004
Endemic fauna of South Africa
Butterflies of Africa